KDF Energy is the leader greenhouse gases emissions trading on the Romanian market. The company was set up in 2002, has subsidiaries in Bulgaria, Greece and Lithuania and is fully controlled by Romanian citizen George Brăiloiu.

KDF Energy is a member of Dutch-based environmental commodities exchange Climex and trades with foreign brokers on London’s European Climate Exchange (ECX) and Paris-based BlueNext.

References

External links
Company official website

Energy companies of Romania